Metro TV is an Indonesian free-to-air television news network based in West Jakarta. It was established on 25 November 2000 and now has over 52 relay stations all over the country. It is owned by Surya Paloh who also owns the Media Indonesia daily. These two, along with other newspapers distributed in different parts of Indonesia, are part of the Media Group.

It is the only TV network to offer Mandarin-language news programs in Indonesia and no soap opera, although recently it has also begun to broadcast entertainment and multicultural programs such as the now-defunct tech show e-Lifestyle, the satirical news and current affairs show Republik Mimpi (The Dream Republic), musical programming such as Musik+ and Idenesia, and other special or regional programming.

History
Metro TV was launched on 25 November 2000 by Abdurrahman Wahid, the fourth President of Indonesia. Metro TV was the first Indonesian television network to have been officially inaugurated by the Indonesian president himself.

On 25 November 2020, during the network's 20th anniversary, its on-air bug was replaced with eagle icon of the current logo with the text "METRO TV" in smaller size below the eagle, although the text was removed during advertisements and this leaves only the eagle in light grey color. However, the logo shown in the infobox is still used for corporate purposes and other brandings. On 25 November 2021, the text "METRO TV" in smaller size below the eagle was removed entirely as part of on-screen revamp.

Programming
Metro TV has a different concept than the other networks in Indonesia. It broadcasts 24 hours a day, with programmes focused on news around the world. Unlike other stations, Metro TV never airs sinetrons.

Metro TV broadcast three new English language programmes, World News, Indonesia Now, and Talk Indonesia. It also had Chinese language programmes such as Metro Xin Wen, as well as IT, documentary, and culinary programmes. It has a motivation talkshow, Mario Teguh Golden Ways. It also shows business programming, including "Economic Challenges" and Bisnis Hari Ini (Business Today, no longer aired).

Metro TV also has an informercial block, usually residential, but sometimes, any price of product and technology. The infomercial block usually airs on networks and stations during morning on weekends. The block has no commercial breaks. This channel is owned by Media Group, which also owns Media Indonesia and Lampung Post newspapers.

However, Metro TV was not the first Indonesian network to be broadcast in English. RCTI became the first Indonesian network to broadcast in English when showing Indonesia Today on 1 November 1996. This English news programme was made with a specific target audience in mind: foreigners who wanted to know the latest news and more information about Indonesia. It ended in 2001. Metro TV later broadcast Metro This Morning and News Flash. Metro This Morning ended in October 2007. Metro TV was the only news channel in Indonesia until 2008, when Lativi was re-branded as tvOne by dropping all of sitcoms as well as soap operas, focusing on news and sports programmes.

Presenters

Current
 Marvin Sulistio
 Zackia Arfan
 Fiona Yuan
 Eugenie Gani
 Lusi Zhang (Taste Hunter)
 Leonard Samosir (also a host of Economic Challenges) (also at BN Channel)
 Zilvia Iskandar (also a host of Kontroversi)
 Aviani Malik
 Kevin Egan (Former BeritaSatu anchor)
 Eva Wondo
 Reno Reksa
 Valentinus Resa
 Gadis Bianca
 Febrian Ahmad
 Gema Tanjung
 Mercy Widjaja (also at BN Channel)
 Jessica Wulandari (also at BN Channel)
 Nisrina Kirana
 Krishna Sam (also at Metro Globe Network)
 Audrey Widodo
 Abdy Azwar Sahi
 Vera Bahasuan
 Iqbal Himawan (also at Metro Globe Network)
 Naila Husna
 Widya Saputra
 Vallencia Melvinsy
 Yohana Margaretha
 Fitri Megantara
 Fifi Aleyda Yahya (also at Metro Globe Network)
 Hamdan Alkafie (former Kompas TV anchor)
 Jason Sambouw
 Boy Noya (also an anchor managing head of Metro TV)
 Runny Rudiyanti (also at Metro Globe Network)
 Sandi Firdaus
 Indra Maulana (former CNN Indonesia anchor)
 Livia Ramadhanti
 Soza Hutapea
 Marselina Tumundo
 Anggi Hasibuan
 Andy F. Noya (Kick Andy)
 Hotman Paris Hutapea (Hot Room)
 Bayu Oktara (Gaspoll and The O Factor)
 David Chalik (Khazanah Islam)
 Hilbram Dunar (Khazanah Islam)
 Permata Sari Harahap (Go Healthy)
 Choky Sitohang (Go Healthy)
 Ronal Surapradja (Go Healthy)
 Edwin Lau (Go Healthy)
 Tantri Moerdopo (Go Healthy)

Former
 Tommy Tjokro (now at BuddyKu)
 Olivia Marzuki (now at CNA)
 Prabu Revolusi (now at MNC Media)
 Fessy Alwi
 Zelda Savitri
 Ralph Tampubolon (now at Most Radio)
 Kania Sutisnawinata (now at Metro Globe Network and Media Group)
 Helmi Johannes (now at VOA Indonesia)
 Robert Haryanto
 Timothy Marbun (now at Kompas TV)
 Putri Ayuningtyas (now at CNN Indonesia)
 Frida Lidwina (now at CNN Indonesia)
 Andini Effendi (former Global TV and antv anchor)
 Maggie Calista (now at CNN Indonesia)
 Desi Anwar (now at CNN Indonesia)
 Syaza Wisastro (now at CNN Indonesia)
 Heranof Al Basyir (now at CNN Indonesia)
 Eva Julianti Yunizar (now at CNN Indonesia)
 Virgie Baker
 Ajeng Kamaratih
 Cheryl Tanzil
 Dian Mirza (now at MNC Media)
 Najwa Shihab (now a host of Mata Najwa on Narasi TV)
 Tascha Liudmila (now at BTV)
 Sandrina Malakiano
 Gadiza Fauzi
 Anisha Dasuki (now at iNews)
 Nunung Setiyani
 Najla Hilabi
 Yohannes Stephanus Siahainenia
 Ade Mulya
 Wahyu Wiwoho
 Sara Wayne
 Sumi Yang
 Marializia Hasni
 Mesty Hanyta

Development Slogans

Slogans
 Leading the Change (2007–2008)
 Be Smart Be Informed (2008–2010)
 Knowledge to Elevate (2010–present)

Anniversary specials
 News Media Telecast Service (2001)
 All for the Best (2002)
 Triple Star, Triple Experience (2003)
 Excellent Four (2004)
 Moment of Hope (2005)
 Proud of Dedication (2006)
 Leading the Change (2007)
 Proud of Our Nation (2008)
 Cinta Negeriku (Loves of My Nation) (2009)
 Ten Years for the Nation (2010)
 Menuju Indonesia Gemilang (Towards a Brilliant Indonesia) (2011)
 Bersama Menginspirasi Bangsa (Together Inspirate the Nation) (2012)
 Tetap Terbaik (Still the Best) (2013)
 Semakin Terpercaya (More Trusted) (2014)
 Membangun Bangsa Berdaya (Build the Empower Nation) (2015)
 Menggerakkan Harapan Bangsa (Moving the Nations Hope) (2016)
 Adiwarna Bangsa (Supercolor of the Nation) (2017)
 Melangkah Bersama untuk Indonesia (Stepping Together for Indonesia) (2018)
 Menebar Inspirasi (Spreading the Inspiration) (2019)
 Terima kasih Indonesia (Thank you Indonesia) (2020)
 Kebersamaan Memberi Arti (Togetherness Gives Meaning) (2021)
 Bangkit Bergerak Bersama (Get Up and Move Together) (2022)

Gallery

See also
 Indonesia Now
 List of television stations in Indonesia

References

External links

 

Media Group
24-hour television news channels in Indonesia
Television channels and stations established in 2000
Television networks in Indonesia
2000 establishments in Indonesia